Claude Maurer (born 5 January 1975) is a Swiss sailor. He competed in the 49er event at the 2000 Summer Olympics.

References

External links
 

1975 births
Living people
Swiss male sailors (sport)
Olympic sailors of Switzerland
Sailors at the 2000 Summer Olympics – 49er
Place of birth missing (living people)